Klaus Altena (born 19 November 1962) is a German lightweight rower. He won a gold medal at the 1989 World Rowing Championships in Bled, Slovenia and 1990 in Tasmania, Australia with the lightweight men's four.

He also keeps a record with the lightweight men's eight: 5:30.28 min.

References

1962 births
Living people
German male rowers
World Rowing Championships medalists for West Germany
World Rowing Championships medalists for Germany
West German male rowers